Blairsden is a census-designated place (CDP) in Plumas County, California, United States. The population was 39 at the 2010 census, down from 50 at the 2000 census.

History
The Blairsden post office opened in 1913. The name honors James A. Blair, a financier of the Western Pacific Railroad.

Geography
Blairsden is located at  (39.777736, -120.616367).

Demographics

2010
The 2010 United States Census reported that Blairsden had a population of 39. The racial makeup of Blairsden was 38 (97.4%) White, 0 (0.0%) African American, 0 (0.0%) Native American, 0 (0.0%) Asian, 0 (0.0%) Pacific Islander, 1 (2.6%) from other races, and 0 (0.0%) from two or more races. Hispanic or Latino of any race were 2 persons (5.1%).

The Census reported that 39 people (100% of the population) lived in households, 0 (0%) lived in non-institutionalized group quarters, and 0 (0%) were institutionalized.

There were 22 households, out of which 2 (9.1%) had children under the age of 18 living in them, 9 (40.9%) were opposite-sex married couples living together, 2 (9.1%) had a female householder with no husband present, 0 (0%) had a male householder with no wife present.  There were 1 (4.5%) unmarried opposite-sex partnerships, and 0 (0%) same-sex married couples or partnerships. 9 households (40.9%) were made up of individuals, and 3 (13.6%) had someone living alone who was 65 years of age or older. The average household size was 1.77.  There were 11 families (50.0% of all households); the average family size was 2.36.

The population was spread out, with 3 people (7.7%) under the age of 18, 2 people (5.1%) aged 18 to 24, 7 people (17.9%) aged 25 to 44, 13 people (33.3%) aged 45 to 64, and 14 people (35.9%) who were 65 years of age or older.  The median age was 55.8 years. For every 100 females, there were 77.3 males.  For every 100 females age 18 and over, there were 80.0 males.

The homeowner vacancy rate was 0%; the rental vacancy rate was 13.3%.  16 people (41.0% of the population) lived in owner-occupied housing units and 23 people (59.0%) lived in rental housing units.

2000
As of the census of 2000, there were 50 people, 25 households, and 12 families residing in the CDP. The racial makeup of the CDP was 90.00% White, 2.00% Asian, 4.00% from other races, and 4.00% from two or more races. 4.00% of the population were Hispanic or Latino of any race.

There were 25 households, out of which 24.0% had children under the age of 18 living with them, 36.0% were married couples living together, and 52.0% were non-families. 44.0% of all households were made up of individuals, and 12.0% had someone living alone who was 65 years of age or older. The average household size was 2.00 and the average family size was 2.67.

In the CDP the population was spread out, with 22.0% under the age of 18, 10.0% from 18 to 24, 28.0% from 25 to 44, 22.0% from 45 to 64, and 18.0% who were 65 years of age or older. The median age was 40 years. For every 100 females, there were 108.3 males. For every 100 females age 18 and over, there were 116.7 males.

The median income for a household in the CDP was $33,393, and the median income for a family was $26,250. Males had a median income of $41,250 versus $24,444 for females. The per capita income for the CDP was $15,004. There were no families and 11.5% of the population living below the poverty line, including no under eighteens and none of those over 64.

Politics

References

Census-designated places in Plumas County, California
Populated places in the Sierra Nevada (United States)